General elections were held in American Samoa on 2 November 2004. A second round of the election for Governor was held on 16 November.

Results

Governor

House of Representatives

Senate

Delegate to the American House of Representatives

External links
Southwest Nebraska News: CSC graduate wins runoff election in American Samoa

Elections in American Samoa
General
2004 American Samoa elections
United States House of Representatives elections in American Samoa
American Samoa
Election and referendum articles with incomplete results